Iulius Mall Iaşi is a shopping mall located in Iași, Romania. At the time of its completion it was the second mall in Romania (after București Mall), and the first outside Bucharest.

The mall has:
 210 stores
 five-screen movie theatre complex
 20 fast food and other restaurants
 Carrefour Market
 games, bowling, billiards & entertainment
 Kidsland club

See also
Palas Iași
Iulius Mall Cluj
Iulius Mall Suceava
Iulius Mall Timișoara

References

External links

 Iulius Mall Iași Official Site

Shopping malls in Iași